Krzysztof Gała (born 30 March 1996) is a Polish figure skater, starting in man single skating category.

He is a multiple Polish Champion and participant of international events, including World and European Championships.

Programs

Competitive highlights 
JGP: Junior Grand Prix; CS: Challenger Series

References

External links
 

1996 births
Polish male single skaters
Living people
Sportspeople from Łódź